Kapya may be,

Kapya language
Kapya Kaoma